Claude Gaillard (born August 15, 1944) was a member of the National Assembly of France.  He represents the Meurthe-et-Moselle department, and is a member of the Union for a Popular Movement.

References

1944 births
Living people
People from Haute-Savoie
Politicians from Auvergne-Rhône-Alpes
Republican Party (France) politicians
Union for French Democracy politicians
Union for a Popular Movement politicians
Deputies of the 9th National Assembly of the French Fifth Republic
Deputies of the 10th National Assembly of the French Fifth Republic
Deputies of the 11th National Assembly of the French Fifth Republic
Deputies of the 12th National Assembly of the French Fifth Republic